Argo (formerly Kara/Noveren) is a Danish waste management company owned by nine municipalities in the western and southern part of metropolitan Copenhagen, Denmark.  In 2014, Kara/Noveren inaugurated a new, energy-efficient waste-to-energy plant in Roskilde, Energitårnet ("The Energy Tower"), designed by Erick Van Egeraat.

History
The company was established as Kara/Noveren in 2007 through the merger of  Kara and Noveren. In 2017, it was renamed Argo. The new name is short for "affald – ressourcer – genbrug - overskud".

Company
Argo is owned by Greve, Holbæk, Kalundborg, Køge, Lejre, Odsherred, Roskilde, Solrød, and Stevns municipalities. The company has some 400,000 private and 22,500 commercial customers.

The Energy Tower
The Energy Tower waste-to-energy plant was inaugurated on 2 September 2014. The cost of its construction was DKK 1.3 billion. The facility produces electricity for approximately 65,000 households and district heating for 40,000 households, utilizing close to 100% of the energy in the waste as opposed to only 7+ % in the old oven line. The electricity is sold to SEAS-NVE while the heat is sold to Roskilde Forsyning.

The building is the result of an architectural competition won by Erick Van Egeraat in 2010. The building has a two-layered façade, the outer layer consists of amber-colored aluminum plates with laser-cut circular openings. A backlighting scheme creates a spark which for a few minutes every hour gradually illuminates the entire building.

References

External links
 Official website

Waste management companies of Denmark
Electric power companies of Denmark
Companies based in Roskilde Municipality
Buildings and structures in Roskilde Municipality
Danish companies established in 2014
Waste companies established in 2014